Acotiamide, sold under the brand name Acofide, is a medication manufactured and approved in Japan for the treatment of postprandial fullness, upper abdominal bloating, and early satiation due to functional dyspepsia. It acts as an acetylcholinesterase inhibitor.

References 

Acetylcholinesterase inhibitors
Catechol ethers
Salicylamides
Thiazoles
Diisopropylamino compounds
Carboxamides